Leonard H. Bolick is a pastor of the Evangelical Lutheran Church in America and served as the bishop of the North Carolina Evangelical Lutheran Synod from 1997 to 2015. Bolick is known for seeking ecumenical reconciliation and improving relations with the Roman Catholic Church in North Carolina while he has been bishop. Prior to serving as Bishop of North Carolina, Bolick served  as a pastor at Calvary Evangelical Lutheran Church in Concord, North Carolina and St. James Evangelical Lutheran Church in Fayetteville, North Carolina. He later joined the Bishop of North Carolina's personal staff and served in youth ministry and evangelism, and was a member of the Synod's transition team. He was consecrated as Bishop of the North Carolina Synod on February 2, 1997. He was succeeded in this position by Timothy Smith, who was officially installed as bishop of the North Carolina Synod on September 12, 2015.

Bolick received a bachelor's degree in history from Appalachian State University and a master of Divinity from the Lutheran Theological Southern Seminary. He also holds a doctorate in ministry from McCormick Theological Seminary and a doctorate in ministry from the Graduate Theological Foundation, as well as a doctorate of Divinity from Lenoir–Rhyne University. He is married to Rita Bolick and is the father of two children, Joseph and Sarah Bolick.

References 

Living people
20th-century Lutheran bishops
21st-century Lutheran bishops
Evangelical Lutheran Church in America bishops
Appalachian State University alumni
People from Lenoir, North Carolina
Year of birth missing (living people)
Graduate Theological Foundation alumni
20th-century American clergy
21st-century American clergy